Gun Smoke is a 1945 American Western film directed by Howard Bretherton. This is the fifteenth film in the "Marshal Nevada Jack McKenzie" series, and stars Johnny Mack Brown as Jack McKenzie and Raymond Hatton as his sidekick Sandy Hopkins, with Jennifer Holt, Riley Hill and Wen Wright.

Plot

"Nevada Jack" McKenzie, retired marshal, comes upon a toppled stagecoach with two dead bodies. In the town of Pawnee, he learns that one of the victims, Hinkley, was an archaeologist who apparently had discovered the whereabouts of hidden Indian treasure.

With his friend Sandy Hopkins disguising himself as a medicine man, Nevada Jack investigates and finds that saloonkeeper Lucky Baker is behind the crimes, helped by a hired gun called Knuckles. With the help of cafe owner Jane and the dead man's son, Joel Hinkley, the two marshals fend off Lucky and his criminal band.

Cast
Johnny Mack Brown as Marshal Nevada Jack McKenzie
Raymond Hatton as Marshal Sandy
Jennifer Holt as Jane Condon
Riley Hill as Joel Hinkley
Wen Wright as Henchman Knuckles
Earle Hodgins as Sheriff Fin Elder
Ray Bennett as Lucky Baker
Steve Clark as Henchman Soda
Marshall Reed as Henchman Cyclone
John L. Cason as Henchman Red
Louis Hart as Henchman
Frank Ellis as Henchman Deuce
Roy Butler as Sheriff
Kansas Moehring as Henchman Whitey
Dimas Sotello as Shag, Indian Guide

External links

1945 films
American black-and-white films
1945 Western (genre) films
American Western (genre) films
1940s American films
1940s English-language films